The London Riverside is a redevelopment area on the north side of the River Thames in East London, England. The area was identified as a zone of change following the introduction of the Thames Gateway policy in 1995. Proposals for improvements in the area were at first developed by Havering and Barking and Dagenham councils, with a London Riverside Urban Strategy published in 2002. This was incorporated into the first London Plan published by the Mayor of London in 2004. Between 2004 to 2013 the planning powers in London Riverside and the Lower Lea Valley were the responsibility of the London Thames Gateway Development Corporation. Planning powers have now reverted to the local councils. Much of the land available for redevelopment is now owned by GLA Land and Property. There is also a London Riverside business improvement district, which covers a smaller area.

History
The potential for the southern sections of Barking and Dagenham and Havering adjacent to the Thames to be regenerated was identified in the Thames Gateway Planning Framework published in 1995. The Barking/Havering Riverside area was identified as a zone of change that was named London Riverside. This was developed further by the London Riverside Action Group and in 2002 the London Riverside Urban Strategy proposed a number of regeneration and infrastructure improvements.

From 2004 to 2013 the London Thames Gateway Development Corporation took over planning functions from the local councils for the area.

In 2015 the London Riverside Opportunity Area Planning Framework was adopted by the Greater London Authority.

Geography
The area of the London Riverside development stretches from Beckton in the London Borough of Newham in the west to Wennington in the London Borough of Havering in the east. The development spans the River Thames adjacent sections of these boroughs and the London Borough of Barking and Dagenham. Much of the development will re-use brownfield industrial land on the river. The area totals 35 km2. It is expected that by 2016 the London Riverside will provide 20,000 new homes and 25,000 jobs.

The boundaries of the London Riverside have expanded somewhat over time. The original area was bounded by the River Thames to the south and the former A13 road (now the A1306) to the north and stretched only as far west as Barking Reach. It has since expanded to include East Beckton and Barking Town. A smaller area constitutes the London Riverside business improvement district.

Planned developments
The redevelopment plans include:

East London Transit – a transport scheme connecting the area to Barking and Ilford
Beam Park - a new neighbourhood spanning two boroughs
In Barking and Dagenham:
Barking Town – £500 million redevelopment, planned to be strategic centre of London Riverside development
Barking Riverside – 1.8 km2, new community with 10,800 new homes, facilities and DLR extension
Creekmouth
Dagenham Dock – 1.33 km2, environmentally sustainable business cluster called London Sustainable Industries Park
South Dagenham – mixed use site
In Havering:
Beam Reach – area for intensification of manufacturing companies, including plans for a new railway station
Rainham, South Hornchurch and Orchard Village
Wildspace, also known as the London Riverside Conservation Park, – 6.4 km2, a conservation, recreation and amenity zone at Rainham

References

External links
London Thames Gateway Development Corporation – London Riverside

BBC London – London Riverside
blitzandblight.com / Barking Riverside

Thames Gateway
Geography of the London Borough of Newham
Geography of the London Borough of Barking and Dagenham
Geography of the London Borough of Havering
Districts of London on the River Thames
Business improvement districts in London
Redevelopment projects in London
London sub-regions
Redeveloped ports and waterfronts in London